Viscount Addison, of Stallingborough in the County of Lincoln, is a title in the Peerage of the United Kingdom. It was created on 6 July 1945 for the physician and politician Christopher Addison, 1st Baron Addison. He had already been created Baron Addison, of Stallingborough in the County of Lincoln, on 22 May 1937, also in the Peerage of the United Kingdom.  the titles are held by his grandson, the fourth Viscount, who succeeded his father in 1992 (who in his turn had succeeded his elder brother in 1976).

The family seat is Churn Barn, near Oundle, Peterborough.

Viscounts Addison (1945)
Christopher Addison, 1st Viscount Addison (1869–1951) 
Christopher Addison, 2nd Viscount Addison (1904–1976) 
Michael Addison, 3rd Viscount Addison (1914–1992) 
William Matthew Wand Addison, 4th Viscount Addison (b. 1945)

The heir apparent is the present holder's son the Hon. Paul Wand Addison (b. 1973).

Arms

References

Kidd, Charles, Williamson, David (editors). Debrett's Peerage and Baronetage (1990 edition). New York: St Martin's Press, 1990.

1945 establishments in the United Kingdom
Viscountcies in the Peerage of the United Kingdom
Noble titles created in 1945
Noble titles created for UK MPs
Borough of North East Lincolnshire